Boratabenzene is the heteroaromatic anion with the formula [C5H5BH]−. Derivatives of boratabenzene are ligands akin to cyclopentadienyl anion. sandwich or half-sandwich type complexes of many transition metals have been reported.  Electronically related heterocycles are adducts of borabenzene. The adduct C5H5B.pyridine exhibits properties of boratabenzene anion, i.e., it has the character C5H5B−-N+C5H5.

See also 
 borabenzene, silabenzene, germabenzene, stannabenzene, pyridine, phosphorine, arsabenzene, bismabenzene, pyrylium, thiopyrylium, selenopyrylium, telluropyrylium
 Borazine

References

Boron heterocycles
Six-membered rings